Charles W. "Skip" Bowen was the tenth Master Chief Petty Officer of the Coast Guard (MCPOCG).
He assumed the position from MCPOCG Frank A. Welch on June 14, 2006, and was relieved on May 21, 2010, by Michael P. Leavitt. Bowen was previously assigned as the Officer-in-Charge of Coast Guard Station Marathon.

Education

Coast Guard Career
After attending basic training at Coast Guard Station Cape May in Cape May, New Jersey in 1978, his first duty station was to a patrol boat,  in Clearwater, Florida.  From there he was assigned to Coast Guard Station Marathon in the Florida Keys just in time for the Mariel boatlift in 1980.  A subsequent assignment at Station Fort Pierce, Florida, was followed by another patrol boat, this time the newly commissioned , homeported in Miami.  From south Florida, he travelled to the Mid-Atlantic seaboard to join  as the Executive Petty Officer.  Upon advancing to Chief Petty Officer he was assigned as the Officer-in-Charge of Coast Guard Station New Haven, in June 1990.  Following a successful tour at New Haven, he was transferred to Station Sand Key in Clearwater Beach, Florida in 1994.

From 1999 to 2001, Bowen served as the Seventh District Command Master Chief.  In May 2002, Bowen graduated with distinction from the United States Army Sergeants Major Academy. While at the Academy, he was selected as one of the few non-Army students to serve as a class vice president.  Upon graduation, he was awarded the prestigious "William G. Bainbridge Chair of Ethics Award."  From June 2002 to June 2004, Bowen served as the Command Master Chief of the Headquarters Units.  In addition to those duties, he served as the Interim Master Chief Petty Officer of the Coast Guard from July 2002 through October 2002.

Awards and decorations
 Advanced Boat Force Operations Insignia
 Cutterman Insignia
 Officer-in-Charge Afloat Pin
 Officer-in-Charge Ashore Pin
 Commandant Staff Badge
 Master Chief Petty Officer of the Coast Guard

8 Service stripes.

Personal
Bowen's educational accomplishments include a Bachelor of Science Degree magna cum laude from Excelsior University and a Master of Business Administration summa cum laude from Touro University International.  Bowen is married to Janet Kay Bowen (née Cartwright) of Norfolk, Virginia.  He has four children, Mason, Joshua, Joseph, and Kristen.  His son, Mason, is currently on active duty in the Coast Guard.

Post Coast Guard career

In April 2011, Bowen went to work at Bollinger Shipyards, in Lockport, Louisiana.
Bowen's first position at Bollinger was to manage the Sentinel building program.

In August 2012 Bowen was promoted to vice president for Government Relations.

References

This article incorporates text in the public domain from the U.S. Coast Guard's official biography.

External links

Year of birth missing (living people)
Living people
Master Chief Petty Officers of the Coast Guard
Recipients of the Coast Guard Distinguished Service Medal
Excelsior College alumni
Recipients of the Meritorious Service Medal (United States)